Grit is the third album by Norwegian band Madrugada.  The album saw the band once again taking a vastly different approach to their previous release featuring a much rawer and at times more experimental sound with Krautrock and garage rock influences taking precedence.  The album also featured one of the band's most well known songs in the softly atmospheric ballad "Majesty".

Track listing

References

 

Madrugada (band) albums
2002 albums
Virgin Records albums